Cédric Pioline (born 15 June 1969) is a French former professional tennis player who played on the professional tour from 1989 to 2002. He reached the men's singles final at the 1993 US Open and at Wimbledon in 1997. On both occasions, he was beaten by Pete Sampras in straight sets.

Pioline's career-high singles ranking was world No. 5, achieved in 2000.

Pioline won five singles titles in his career, the biggest at the ATP Masters Series event in Monte Carlo in 2000 – his last final on the professional tour. In addition to his finals appearances at the US Open and Wimbledon, he reached 10 other singles finals, including at Monte Carlo in 1993 and 1998. Pioline also competed for France in the Davis Cup, winning the cup in 1996 and 2001. After retiring from tennis, he became a tennis administrator. , he is the tournament director of the ATP Masters Series event in Paris and plays on the senior ATP tour.

Personal life
Pioline grew up in a sporting family. His Romanian mother, Adriana, born in Câmpina, was a volleyball player; she was part of the Romanian national team that reached the finals of the 1956 FIVB World Championship, but were defeated by the Soviet Union. His father, Maurice, also a professional volleyball player, met his mother while at a volleyball match in Paris. He has an older brother named Denis.

He is married to Mireille Bercot; the couple have a son, Andrea (born 14 March 1993).

Other 
In 2011 Pioline was one of the contestants during the second season of the TV show Danse avec les stars.

 Danse avec les stars
 In 2011 he participated in season 2 of Danse avec les stars (the French version of Dancing with the Stars) with his partner Katrina Patchett but sadly got eliminated in the first week.
This table shows the route of Cédric Pioline and Katrina Patchett in Danse Avec Les Stars.
The face to face wasn't rated.

Major finals

Grand Slam finals

Singles: 2 (0–2)

Masters Series finals

Singles: 3 (1–2)

ATP career finals

Singles: 17 (5 titles, 12 runners-up)

Doubles: 1 (1 win)

Singles performance timeline

Best Grand Slam results details

Top 10 wins

Notes

References

External links

 
 
 

1969 births
French male tennis players
French expatriate sportspeople in Switzerland
French people of Romanian descent
Hopman Cup competitors
Living people
Sportspeople from Neuilly-sur-Seine